Survival of the Witless is a card game produced by Avalanche Press about tenure.  Released in 1997, the game was created due to Avalanche Press founder Mike Bennighof's anger at being fired from his teaching job at University of Alabama at Birmingham (UAB) for winning a teaching award as an untenured professor.

Survival of the Witless was Avalanche Press' hottest selling game, but as of 2007 is out of print.

Reviews
Pyramid #28 (Nov./Dec., 1997)

References

Avalanche Press games
Card games introduced in 1997
Dedicated deck card games